The 1951–52 New York Knicks season was the sixth season for the team in the National Basketball Association (NBA). The Knicks finished third in the Eastern Division with a 37–29 record, and advanced to the NBA Playoffs for the sixth consecutive season.

In the first round of the Eastern Division playoffs, the Knicks defeated the Boston Celtics in a best-of-three series, two games to one, to move on to the Eastern Division Finals. New York won 3–1 in a best-of-five series with the Syracuse Nationals to reach its second straight NBA Finals. In the Finals, the Knicks lost to the Minneapolis Lakers in seven games.

NBA draft

Note: This is not an extensive list; it only covers the first and second rounds, and any other players picked by the franchise that played at least one game in the league.

Regular season

Season standings

x = clinched playoff spot

Record vs. opponents

Game log

Playoffs

|- align="center" bgcolor="#ffcccc"
| 1
| March 19
| @ Boston
| L 94–105
| Max Zaslofsky (20)
| Dick McGuire (7)
| Boston Garden
| 0–1
|- align="center" bgcolor="#ccffcc"
| 2
| March 23
| Boston
| W 101–97
| Connie Simmons (22)
| Dick McGuire (7)
| Madison Square Garden III
| 1–1
|- align="center" bgcolor="#ccffcc"
| 3
| March 26
| @ Boston
| W 88–87 (2OT)
| Max Zaslofsky (21)
| Dick McGuire (9)
| Boston Garden
| 2–1
|-

|- align="center" bgcolor="#ccffcc" 
| 1
| April 2
| @ Syracuse
| W 87–85
| Max Zaslofsky (26)
| Onondaga War Memorial
| 1–0
|- align="center" bgcolor="#ffcccc" 
| 2
| April 3
| @ Syracuse
| L 92–102
| Harry Gallatin (16)
| Onondaga War Memorial
| 1–1
|- align="center" bgcolor="#ccffcc" 
| 3
| April 5
| Syracuse
| W 99–92
| Max Zaslofsky (20)
| Madison Square Garden III
| 2–1
|- align="center" bgcolor="#ccffcc" 
| 4
| April 6
| Syracuse
| W 100–93
| Max Zaslofsky (20)
| Madison Square Garden III
| 3–1
|-

|- align="center" bgcolor="#ffcccc"
| 1
| April 12
| @ Minneapolis
| L 79–83 (OT)
| Simmons, McGuire (15)
| Nat Clifton (12)
| Dick McGuire (5)
| St. Paul Auditorium8,722
| 0–1
|- align="center" bgcolor="#ccffcc"
| 2
| April 13
| @ Minneapolis
| W 80–72
| Harry Gallatin (18)
| Harry Gallatin (11)
| Dick McGuire (5)
| St. Paul Auditorium
| 1–1
|- align="center" bgcolor="#ffcccc"
| 3
| April 16
| Minneapolis
| L 77–82
| Max Zaslofsky (17)
| Nat Clifton (10)
| Dick McGuire (10)
| 69th Regiment Armory4,500
| 1–2
|- align="center" bgcolor="#ccffcc"
| 4
| April 18
| Minneapolis
| W 90–89 (OT)
| Connie Simmons (30)
| Nat Clifton (12)
| Dick McGuire (6)
| 69th Regiment Armory5,200
| 2–2
|- align="center" bgcolor="#ffcccc"
| 5
| April 20
| @ Minneapolis
| L 89–102
| Nat Clifton (17)
| Clifton, Gallatin (8)
| six players tied (1)
| St. Paul Auditorium7,244
| 2–3
|- align="center" bgcolor="#ccffcc"
| 6
| April 23
| Minneapolis
| W 76–68
| Max Zaslofsky (23)
| Harry Gallatin (13)
| Ernie Vandeweghe (7)
| 69th Regiment Armory3,000
| 3–3
|- align="center" bgcolor="#ffcccc"
| 7
| April 25
| @ Minneapolis
| L 65–82
| Max Zaslofsky (21)
| Nat Clifton (10)
| Nat Clifton (3)
| Minneapolis Auditorium8,612
| 3–4
|-

Player statistics

Awards and records

Transactions

See also
1951–52 NBA season

References

External links
1951–52 New York Knickerbockers Statistics

New York Knicks
New York Knicks season
New York Knicks
New York Knicks seasons
1950s in Manhattan
Madison Square Garden